Nieuwendijk is a village in the Dutch province of North Brabant. It is a part of the municipality of Altena, and lies about 8 km south of Gorinchem.

History 
The village was first mentioned in 1468 as Nyewendijck, and means "new dike". Nieuwendijk was a village of dike workers and reed cutters, and could only be reached by water.

Nieuwendijk was home to 219 people in 1840. In 1970, the Haringvliet was closed off and the reed disappeared.

Notable people 
Marieke Lucas Rijneveld, poet, novelist, and co-winner of the 2020 International Booker Prize, grew up by the River Bakkerskil in Nieuwendijk.

Gallery

References

Populated places in North Brabant
Geography of Altena, North Brabant